Paul Kline (1937 – 25 September 1999) was a psychologist at the University of Exeter.

Kline was interested in depth psychology, especially theories of Sigmund Freud, the founder of psychoanalysis. He was also an expert in psychometrics and carried out extensive research in the statistical analysis of personality and intelligence.

In his 1972 book Fact and Fantasy in Freudian Theory, widely translated, he brought these two interests together, examining the objective evidence for various ideas of Freudian theory, finding that some, but not all, were supported by the evidence. He also wrote introductory books to psychometrics, for example An easy guide to factor analysis (1994).  He was a prolific author, writing or editing at least 14 books, and over 150 scientific papers are listed under his name in Web of Science.

Kline was originally educated in classics, in education, and in statistics: he studied at the University of Reading, University College Swansea, the University of Aberdeen and the University of Manchester.  When he first joined the University of Exeter, it was as a staff member in the university's then Institute of Education.  However, in 1969 he joined the Department of Psychology as a Lecturer, rising eventually to become the university's first Professor of Psychometrics.  Among colleagues, Kline had a reputation as an opinionated controversialist who remained a genial and supportive colleague; he was revered by students for the wit and clarity of his lectures.

References

1937 births
1999 deaths
English psychologists
Academics of the University of Exeter
20th-century psychologists